The Hans Baumann Trophy, which was endowed by the Spanish members of the IHF, commemorates the late President of the IHF (1950 to 1971), Hans Baumann. It is awarded to IHF member federations from 1972 to 2015. In 2017, the IHF Council decided to reform and rename it as the IHF President's Development Award.

History
The Hans Baumann Trophy was awarded to a member federation every two years at the IHF Congress from 1972 to 2015. It was awarded for particular services to the development and spread of Handball in the member federation's own country and/or throughout the world.

The recipient was selected and the trophy awarded by the IHF Council at the recommendation of the IHF Executive Committee. Member federations may submit a detailed recommendation to the IHF Head Office, specifying the reasons, no later than six months before the Congress.

The member federation receiving the award was given a diploma drawn up by the donors and a small replica of the trophy.

In 1986, Royal Spanish Handball Federation has been selected as the recipient of the Hans Baumann Trophy. The Royal Spanish Handball Federation has made a particular contribution by organizing the symposium and special tournament for studying and testing
new ideas for the format of the game.

In 2002, Handball Federation of Russia has been selected as the recipient of the Hans Baumann Trophy. The Handball Union of Russia was awarded the trophy for the great contribution to the world development of this sport.

In 2017, IHF Council decided to reframe and rename it as the IHF President's Development Award.

List of winners
From the commencement of the Trophy till 2015 when the award was reformed and renamed as IHF President's Development Award, the trophy has been awarded to the following national handball federations for their extra ordinary contribution to the development of Handball.

References

External links
 IHF Statuts Chapter XXI - Regulations of Awards

International Handball Federation awards